Ixamatus is a genus of spiders in the family Microstigmatidae. It was first described in 1887 by Simon. , it contains 10 Australian species.

Species

Ixamatus comprises the following species:
Ixamatus barina Raven, 1982
Ixamatus broomi Hogg, 1901
Ixamatus caldera Raven, 1982
Ixamatus candidus Raven, 1982
Ixamatus fischeri Raven, 1982
Ixamatus lornensis Raven, 1985
Ixamatus musgravei Raven, 1982
Ixamatus rozefeldsi Raven, 1985
Ixamatus varius (L. Koch, 1873)
Ixamatus webbae Raven, 1982

References

Microstigmatidae
Mygalomorphae genera
Spiders of Australia